Scopula sapor is a moth of the family Geometridae first described by Herbert Druce in 1910. It is found in Cameroon.

References

Endemic fauna of Cameroon
Moths described in 1910
sapor
Insects of Cameroon
Moths of Africa